Manfred Trenz  (born 29 November 1965 in Saarbrücken) is a German video game developer.

He is the developer of the Turrican video game series as well as the Commodore 64 version of the game R-Type. He also made The Great Giana Sisters. He is currently developing games for his own company, Denaris Entertainment Software.

Games

References

External links 
The Manfred Trenz Fanpage
Interview with Manfred Trenz
Denaris Entertainment Software

1965 births
Living people
21st-century German inventors
German video game designers
Video game programmers